Agate Fossil Beds National Monument is a U.S. National Monument near Harrison, Nebraska. The main features of the monument are a valley of the Niobrara River and the fossils found on Carnegie Hill and University Hill.

The area largely consists of grass-covered plains. Plants on the site include prairie sandreed, blue grama, little bluestem and needle and thread grass, and the wildflowers lupin, spiderwort, western wallflower and sunflowers.

History 

Originally the Agate Springs Ranch, a working cattle ranch, was owned by Capt. James Cook. The monument's museum collection also contains more than 500 artifacts from the Cook Collection of Plains Indians artifacts.

The national monument was authorized on June 5, 1965, but was not established until June 14, 1997.  The Harold J. Cook Homestead (Bone Cabin Complex) was listed on the National Register of Historic Places in 1977.  Agate Fossil Beds is maintained by the National Park Service.

Paleontology 
The site is best known for a large number of well-preserved Miocene fossils, many of which were found at dig sites on Carnegie and University Hills. Fossils from the Harrison Formation and Anderson Ranch Formation, which date to the Arikareean in the North American land mammal classification, about 20 to 16.3 million years ago, are among some of the best specimens of Miocene mammals. 

Species found in Agate include:
 Miohippus, Merychippus and Parahippus, ancestors of the modern day horse.
 Diceratherium, two-horned rhinoceros.
 Menoceras, pony-sized rhinoceros, the most common animal found in the fossil beds.
 Daphoenodon, a bear dog.
 Promerycochoerus, a semiaquatic hippo-like oreodont.
 Daeodon, the largest Entelodont (giant pig-like ungulate).
 Stenomylus , gazelle-like camelids.
 Oxydactylus, giraffe-like camelids.
 Palaeocastor, land beavers that dug large corkscrew-shaped burrows (Daemonelix).
 Moropus, a chalicothere which are relatives of rhinos and horses.
 Merychyus, a sheep-like oreodont.
 Syndyoceras, antelope-like mammal and extinct relatives of artiodactyls.

Gallery

See also

List of fossil sites
List of national monuments of the United States
Ashfall Fossil Beds
Florissant Fossil Beds National Monument
John Day Fossil Beds National Monument
Scotts Bluff National Monument

References

External links

 Official NPS website: Agate Fossil Beds National Monument

Federal lands in Nebraska
National Park Service National Monuments in Nebraska
Cenozoic paleontological sites of North America
Miocene paleontological sites
Natural history of Nebraska
Protected areas established in 1997
Dinosaur museums in the United States
Natural history museums in Nebraska
Museums in Sioux County, Nebraska
Protected areas of Sioux County, Nebraska
1997 establishments in Nebraska
Fossil parks in the United States
Paleontology in Nebraska
Paleontological protected areas in the United States
1997 in paleontology
National Register of Historic Places in Sioux County, Nebraska